Alexander Stewart (c. 1220 – 1282), known as Alexander of Dundonald, was a Scottish magnate who in 1241 succeeded his father as hereditary High Steward of Scotland.

Origins
He was the son of Walter Stewart, 3rd High Steward of Scotland.

Career
He apparently fought on the Seventh Crusade under King Louis IX of France, during which his younger brother John was killed at Damietta in Egypt in 1249. He also seems to have made a pilgrimage to Santiago de Compostela in Spain and in honour of the saint baptised his eldest surviving son James, a name rare before then in Scotland. In 1255 he appears as one of the Regents of Scotland during the minority of King Alexander III. He seems to have commanded the right wing of the armed force which, at Largs in October 1263, successfully defended Scotland against attempted invasion by King Haakon IV of Norway. It appears to have been in his time that the Stewarts acquired the lordship of the Cowal peninsula, with their castle at Dunoon. He is recorded as playing a prominent part in affairs during the reign of Alexander, being referred to as senescallus Scotie (steward of Scotland) instead of the older dapifer regis Scotie (steward of the king of Scotland), so indicating that he held a major office of state that was significant nationally rather than just being a courtier in the royal household. 

He died in 1282, and was succeeded by his son James.

Family
His wife is said to have been named Jean, and they had four documented children:
James Stewart, 5th High Steward of Scotland
Sir John Stewart of Bonkyll
Elizabeth Stewart, who married Sir William Douglas the Hardy.
Hawise Stewart, who married John de Soules

References

Bibliography
 Lauder-Frost, Gregory, F.S.A.Scot., "East Anglian Stewarts" in The Scottish Genealogist, Dec.2004, vol.LI, no.4., pps:151-161. 

Nisbet, Alexander, 1722. Vol.1,p. 48; and appendix, page 149.
Burke, Messrs., John and John Bernard, The Royal Families of England, Scotland, and Wales, and Their Descendants &c., volume 2, London, 1851, p. xlii.
Anderson, William, "The Scottish Nation", Edinburgh, 1867, vol.vii, p. 200.
Mackenzie, A. M., MA., D.Litt., The Rise of the Stewarts, London, 1935, pp. 13–14.
The Marquis de Ruvigny & Raineval, The Jacobite Peerage &c., London & Edinburgh (1904), 1974 reprint, p. 8n. Agnatic ancestor of British kings.

1220 births
1283 deaths
Year of birth uncertain
Alexander
Christians of the Seventh Crusade
High Stewards of Scotland